Anacrusis epidicta is a species of moth of the family Tortricidae. It is found in Bahia, Brazil.

The wingspan is about 28 mm. The ground colour of the forewings is pale cream brown, dotted and strigulated (finely streaked) with brown and black. The markings are brownish. The hindwings are ochreous cream, tinged brownish in the anal and terminal area and paler basally.

Etymology
The species name refers to the colouration of the species and is derived from Greek near and Latin dicta, from dico (meaning marked).

References

Moths described in 2011
Atteriini
Moths of South America
Taxa named by Józef Razowski